Davao Gulf is a gulf situated in the southeastern portion of Mindanao in the Philippines. Davao Gulf cuts into the island of Mindanao from the Philippine Sea. It is surrounded by all five provinces in the Davao Region. The largest island in the gulf is Samal Island. Davao City, on the gulf's west coast, is the largest and busiest port on the gulf. The Bagobo and the Kaagan / Kalagan, who are the indigenous lumad tribes endemic in Davao, are known inhabitants of the said gulf.

Wildlife
The gulf water is regarded as one of the most diverse cetacean habitats in the nation, being home for at least 10 species of toothed whales and dolphins such as sperm whales and beaked whales. Also whale sharks and sea cows are seen frequently. Furthermore, several ecological phenomena have been observed in Davao Gulf such as a previously unknown predator of the crown-of-thorns starfish, new species records, and new species discoveries underlining the uniqueness of the marine resources in Davao Gulf.

References

Gulfs of the Philippines
Gulfs of the Pacific Ocean
Philippine Sea
Landforms of Davao Oriental
Landforms of Davao de Oro
Landforms of Davao del Norte
Landforms of Davao del Sur
Landforms of Davao Occidental